Ware is an extinct Bantu language near Lake Victoria in East Africa.

ISO removal
When an SIL team failed to find any speakers, Ethnologue retired the ISO code, apparently not realizing the language was known to be extinct.

References

Great Lakes Bantu languages
Extinct languages of Africa
Extinct languages